Kotabaru FC or Kotabaru Football Club  is an Indonesian football club based in Kotabaru Regency, South Kalimantan. They currently play at Liga 3.

Honours
 Liga 3 South Kalimantan
 Winner: 2018
 Runner-up: 2019

References

Football clubs in Indonesia
Football clubs in South Kalimantan
Association football clubs established in 2017
2017 establishments in Indonesia